Aksha is a rural locality (a selo) and the administrative center of Akshinsky District of Zabaykalsky Krai, Russia, located at the confluence of the Aksha and Onon Rivers,  south of Chita. Population:

History
It was founded in 1750 as a Cossack frontier fort to prevent penetration of the Chinese into the Russian territory. Since then it was used as a prison and many famous political criminals were sent there. In 1872, it was granted town status, but was demoted to a rural locality after the October Revolution.  The prison was also abolished after the Revolution.

Climate

Aksha has a hemiboreal humid continental climate (Köppen climate classification Dwb), with severely cold winters and very warm summers. Precipitation is quite low, but is much higher in summer than at other times of the year.

References

Rural localities in Zabaykalsky Krai
Transbaikal Oblast